F3 Nation, or F3, is a network of free, peer-led workouts for men, founded in the United States on January 1, 2011 in Charlotte, North Carolina with an estimated 40,000+ active participants.  These participants can be found at approximately 3,300 workout locations in 46 different states and 6 countries on 4 continents 

The F3 name is an initialism, which stands for fitness, fellowship and faith, referring to the group's three organizing principles.

F3 has 5 "Core Principles" for their workouts.

  Be free of charge.
  Be open to all men.
  Be held outdoors, rain or shine, heat or cold.
  Be led by men who participate in the workout in a rotating fashion, with no training or certification necessary.
  End with a Circle of Trust.

F3 is affiliated with FiA, or Females in Action, a network of free, peer-led workouts for women.

Each man participating in an F3 workout is assigned a nickname which he'll use during subsequent workouts.

F3 began in 2011, in North Carolina, when two friends in Charlotte started a boot camp style workout for men.

F3 participants apply a distinctive lexicon of terms during their workouts.  For example, an informal group leader is known as a "Nantan," a term adopted from an Apache word meaning chief.

References

External links
 

Organizations established in 2011
Exercise organizations
Men's organizations in the United States